Vesper purpurascens, synonym Cymopterus purpurascens, is a species of flowering plant in the carrot family Apiaceae, known by the common name widewing springparsley. It is native to much of the western United States, including the desert regions. It is a perennial herb, often stemless, producing leaves and inflorescence from ground level or from a fibrous basal stalk. The waxy, fleshy leaves have blades divided into multilobed leaflets and are borne on short petioles. The inflorescence is a rounded cluster of flowers held on a peduncle which may be erect and several centimeters tall or nearly nonexistent. The purple flowers are sheathed in dark-veined white bracts.

References

External links
Jepson Manual Treatment
USDA Plants Profile
Photo gallery

Apiaceae
Endemic flora of the United States
Flora of the Western United States
Flora of the California desert regions
Flora of New Mexico
Flora of the Great Basin
Natural history of the Mojave Desert
Critically endangered flora of the United States